The Bellevue Bridge (known as the Bellevue Toll Bridge and officially called the Grand Army of the Republic Bridge) is a continuous truss bridge over the Missouri River connecting Mills County, Iowa and Sarpy County, Nebraska at Bellevue, Nebraska.

The bridge formerly connected Nebraska Highway 370 and Iowa Highway 370. Both routes were truncated upon the completion of the US 34 bridge downstream.

The bridge was built in 1950 by the Bellevue Bridge Commission at a cost of $2.8 million (equivalent to $ million in ). Although the bridge is considered obsolete, there are no current plans to replace it. Various government entities have sparred over ownership, due to the expense of maintenance, after the initial bonds were paid off in 2000. The issue has been temporarily resolved since the Bridge Commission has had to seek more than $1 million in bonds for repairs to the bridge.

See also
List of crossings of the Missouri River

External links
Omaha River Front article
Iowa photos on bridge

Continuous truss bridges in the United States
Road bridges in Nebraska
Buildings and structures in Mills County, Iowa
Buildings and structures in Sarpy County, Nebraska
Toll bridges in Iowa
Toll bridges in Nebraska
Bridges completed in 1950
Bridges over the Missouri River
Road bridges in Iowa
Steel bridges in the United States
Interstate vehicle bridges in the United States